Jochen Danneberg (born 9 April 1953) is an East German former ski jumper.

Career
Danneberg's best finish was a silver medal in the individual normal hill at the 1976 Winter Olympics in Innsbruck. He also won the Four Hills Tournament twice, in 1976 and 1977. For many years he has been the main trainer for the South Korean national ski jumping team.

World Cup

Standings

Wins

Invalid ski jumping world record

 Not recognized! Crashed at world record distance.

References

External links
 
 

1953 births
Living people
People from Halberstadt
People from Bezirk Magdeburg
German male ski jumpers
Sportspeople from Saxony-Anhalt
Olympic ski jumpers of East Germany
Ski jumpers at the 1976 Winter Olympics
Ski jumpers at the 1980 Winter Olympics
Olympic silver medalists for East Germany
Olympic medalists in ski jumping
German ski jumping coaches
Medalists at the 1976 Winter Olympics